Ricardo Hocevar won the title, defeating Thiemo de Bakker 7–6(7–1), 7–6(7–4) in the final.

Seeds

Draw

Finals

Top half

Bottom half

References
 Main Draw
 Qualifying Draw

Campeonato Internacional de Tenis do Estado do Para - Singles
2012 Singles